James Eugene Storm (born February 2, 1941) is an American rower who competed in the 1964 Summer Olympics.

He was born in San Diego, California.

In 1964 he won the silver medal with his partner Seymour Cromwell in the double sculls event.

References

External links
 

1941 births
Living people
American male rowers
Rowers at the 1964 Summer Olympics
Olympic silver medalists for the United States in rowing
World Rowing Championships medalists for the United States
Medalists at the 1964 Summer Olympics
Pan American Games medalists in rowing
Pan American Games gold medalists for the United States
Rowers at the 1967 Pan American Games